Elections to Armagh City and District Council were held on 7 June 2001 on the same day as the other Northern Irish local government elections. The election used four district electoral areas to elect a total of 22 councillors.

Election results

Note: "Votes" are the first preference votes.

Districts summary

|- class="unsortable" align="centre"
!rowspan=2 align="left"|Ward
! % 
!Cllrs
! % 
!Cllrs
! %
!Cllrs
! %
!Cllrs
! % 
!Cllrs
!rowspan=2|TotalCllrs
|- class="unsortable" align="center"
!colspan=2 bgcolor="" | UUP
!colspan=2 bgcolor="" | SDLP
!colspan=2 bgcolor="" | Sinn Féin
!colspan=2 bgcolor="" | DUP
!colspan=2 bgcolor="white"| Others
|-
|align="left"|Armagh City
|18.8
|1
|bgcolor="#99FF66"|29.1
|bgcolor="#99FF66"|2
|29.1
|2
|11.6
|1
|11.4
|0
|6
|-
|align="left"|Crossmore
|13.7
|1
|bgcolor="#99FF66"|39.9
|bgcolor="#99FF66"|2
|32.6
|0
|13.8
|0
|0.0
|0
|5
|-
|align="left"|Cusher
|34.5
|3
|11.7
|1
|6.9
|0
|bgcolor="#D46A4C"|44.7
|bgcolor="#D46A4C"|2
|2.2
|0
|6
|-
|align="left"|The Orchard
|bgcolor="40BFF5"|34.3
|bgcolor="40BFF5"|2
|20.2
|1
|17.0
|1
|28.5
|1
|0.0
|0
|5
|- class="unsortable" class="sortbottom" style="background:#C9C9C9"
|align="left"| Total
|25.9
|7
|24.4
|6
|20.6
|5
|25.6
|4
|3.5
|0
|22
|-
|}

District results

Armagh City

1997: 2 x SDLP, 2 x Sinn Féin, 2 x UUP
2001: 2 x SDLP, 2 x Sinn Féin, 1 x UUP, 1 x DUP
1997-2001 Change: DUP gain from UUP

Crossmore

1997: 3 x SDLP, 1 x Sinn Féin, 1 x UUP
2001: 2 x SDLP, 2 x Sinn Féin, 1 x DUP
1997-2001 Change: Sinn Féin gain from SDLP

Cusher

1997: 4 x UUP, 1 x DUP, 1 x SDLP
2001: 3 x UUP, 2 x DUP, 1 x SDLP
1997-2001 Change: DUP gain from UUP

The Orchard

1997: 3 x UUP, 1 x DUP, 1 x SDLP
2001: 2 x UUP, 1 x DUP, 1 x Sinn Féin, 1 x SDLP
1997-2001 Change: Sinn Féin gain from UUP

References

Armagh City and District Council elections
Armagh